Robert H. Treman State Park is a  state park located in Tompkins County, in the Finger Lakes region of New York in the United States. The park is situated in the towns of Ithaca, Enfield and Newfield.

History
Robert H. Treman first purchased land surrounding Enfield Falls in 1915, and worked to improve the property by planting over 1,000 trees. He and his wife, Laura Treman (Hosie), donated the land to New York State in 1920 for the establishment of Enfield Glen State Park. The park was renamed in Robert H. Treman's honor following his death in 1937.

The Enfield Falls Mill and Miller's House was listed on the National Register of Historic Places in 1979.

Geology
The rock formations within the park are primarily made of Devonian shale and sandstone. These rocks formed in horizontal layers, creating flat slabs and angular edges as they erode and fracture. 

The valley and waterfalls formed since the last ice age — within the last twenty or thirty thousands years — roughly in-line with previous streambeds. However, around Lucifer Falls, the current streambed completely deviates from its now drift-filled interglacial streambed (where the creek flowed in-between periods of glaciation). This path of new erosion is distinguished by its steep cliffs and narrow gorge.

Additional rock formations near Lucifer Falls include current ripple marks, indicating the direction the creek used to flow.

Park description
Robert H. Treman State Park is located along State Route 327, just west of state routes 13, 34, and 96. The park offers an outdoor swimming area at the base of a waterfall, picnic tables, playing fields, hiking and camping.

The park has numerous waterfalls along a  round-trip hike. The hiking trails follow Enfield Creek, giving many views of the rock formations in the deep, narrow gorge known as Enfield Glen. A natural swimming pool is located at the easternmost waterfall, known as Lower Falls. Views of Lucifer Falls can be found along the gorge trail, in addition to overlooks along the rim trail. The Finger Lakes Trail skirts the southern edge of the park.

Because of dangerous conditions created by snow and ice, most of the park's trails are inaccessible in the winter. Visitors can view Lower Falls year-round.

Gallery

See also
 Buttermilk Falls State Park  
 List of New York state parks

References

External links

 New York State Parks: Robert H. Treman State Park
 Robert H. Treman State Park Trail Map
 Lucifer Falls

State parks of New York (state)
Parks in Tompkins County, New York
Tourist attractions in Ithaca, New York
Waterfalls of New York (state)
Glens of the United States
1920 establishments in New York (state)
Protected areas established in 1920